Étienne-Ossian Henry (27 November 1798 in Paris – 26 August 1873) was a French chemist, son of Nöel Étienne Henry (1769–1832), and trained by his father, who was director of the Central Pharmacy of the Parisian hospitals and professor in the School of Pharmacy. In 1824, he became director of the chemical laboratory of the Academy of Medicine.  He discovered sinapin and studied mineral waters, the milk of various animals, nicotine, and tannin. In 1827, with Auguste-Arthur Plisson, who had studied under his father, he discovered aspartic acid.

In 1845, he invented the first true burette for titration.

His son was Emmanuel-Ossian Henry (1826-1867).

Works
His works include:
Traité pratique d'analyse chimique des eaux minérales (second edition, 1858), with his father
Mémoiré sur l'analyse organique (1830), with Plisson
Analyse chimique des eaux qui alimentent les fontaines publiques de Paris (1848), with Boutron-Gharland
A translation of the Codex Medicamentarius (1827), with Ratier

References

External links
 Notice sur les travaux de M. Henry fils: Pharmacien, membre de l'Academie royale de medecine, ex-sous-chef a la Pharmacie centrale, membre des societes de pharmacie, de chimie medicale, des pharmaciens de l'allemagne septentrionale, l'un des redacteurs du journal de pharmacie, etc.

19th-century French chemists
French science writers
1798 births
Henry, Etienne Henry
French male non-fiction writers